The Beazley Medals are two annual awards awarded by the School Curriculum and Standards Authority (and previously the Curriculum Council of Australia). The award is the highest profile and most prestigious academic award for secondary students in Australia. From 2001 onwards, two medals have been awarded each year — one to the top TEE student (ACE from 2010 onward) and one to the top vocational education and training (VET) student.

The medal was first awarded in 1984 and is named after former Federal Education Minister Kim Beazley Sr. In 2000, a new student award, the Excellence in Vocational Studies Award, was introduced for the student who demonstrated the best results in a secondary school vocational program. The award was renamed the Beazley Medal: VET in the following year to reflect its equal status.

Past winners

Beazley Medal: TEE/WACE 

 1984: Jason George Cyster, Guildford Grammar School
 1985: Patrick Hon-Shing Lai, Christ Church Grammar School
 1986: Sherwant Singh Gill, Lynwood Senior High School
 1987: David John Holthouse, Wanneroo Senior High School
 1988: Eu-Jin Ang, Christ Church Grammar School
 1989: Howard Ho-Wah Yip, Churchlands Senior High School
 1990: Rae-Lin Huang, Hollywood Senior High School
 1991: Graham Alistair Thom, Gosnells Senior High School
 1992: Jonathan Paget, Churchlands Senior High School
 1993: Bertrand Sze Yu Lee, Applecross Senior High School
 1994: Bonnie Kar Yee Chu, Presbyterian Ladies' College
 1995: Anthea Lee Prestage, St Hilda's Anglican School for Girls
 1996: David Chen Liaw, Christ Church Grammar School
 1997: Mamie Tong, Penrhos College
 1998: Michael Molinari (TEE),  Christ Church Grammar School - shared with Michael Gibson
 1999: Neil Rabinowitz (TEE), Carmel School
 2000: Anthony Phillips (TEE), Hale School
 2001: Antony Moser (TEE), Hale School
 2002: Jolene Carmen Yap, (TEE), St Hilda's Anglican School for Girls
 2003: Dougal Maclaurin (TEE), Hale School
 2004: Carryn Vincec (TEE), Perth College
 2005: Adrian Khoo (TEE), Scotch College
 2006: Chris Mofflin (TEE), Hale School
 2007: Neil Thomas (TEE), Wesley College
 2008: Binu Jayawardena (TEE), Hale School
 2009: Hayley Anderson (TEE), Churchlands Senior High School
 2010: Michael Taran (WACE), Perth Modern School
 2011: Calum Braham (WACE), Trinity College
 2012: Katie Dyer (WACE), St Hilda's Anglican School for Girls
 2013: Katerina Chua (WACE), St Hilda's Anglican School for Girls
 2014: Jamin Wu (WACE), Perth Modern School
 2015: Hui Min Tay (WACE), Perth Modern School
 2016: Caitlin Revell (WACE), Perth Modern School
 2017: Isabel Longbottom (WACE), Rossmoyne Senior High School
2018: Pooja Ramesh (WACE), Perth Modern School
2019: Charlotte "Charlie" Singleton (WACE), Methodist Ladies' College
2020: Josh Green (WACE), Christ Church Grammar School
2021: Lawrence Nheu (WACE), Perth Modern School
2022: Jessica Doan (WACE), Perth Modern School

Beazley Medal: VET 
 2000: Darren Chapman, WA College of Agriculture, Narrogin (Excellence in Vocational Studies Award)
 2001: Bianca Batten, Forrestfield Senior High School
 2002: Natasha Lea Pierce, Clarkson Community High School
 2003: Joel David Treeby, WA College of Agriculture, Denmark
 2004: Lachlan Patterson, WA College of Agriculture, Narrogin
 2005: Linda Greenwood Tully, Methodist Ladies' College
 2006: Michael Gibbings, WA School of Agriculture, Harvey
 2007: Michelle Kite, Corpus Christi College
 2008: Emma Hudson, St Mary's Anglican Girls' School
 2009: Andrew Reynolds, WA College of Agriculture, Cunderdin
 2010: Jaclyn East, WA College of Agriculture, Narrogin
 2011: Nicole Kerr, Woodvale Secondary College
 2012: Madisen Scott, Woodvale Secondary College
 2013: Emma Hay, Georgiana Molloy Anglican School
 2014: Robert Rubery, Applecross Senior High School
 2015: Megan McSeveney, WA College of Agriculture, Harvey
 2016: Tate Bertola, Esperance Senior High School
 2017: Andreea Ioan, Willetton Senior High School
2018: Jess Haydon, Swan Valley Anglican Community School
2019: Jesse Morris-Parmer, St Mark's Anglican Community School
2020: Luke de Laeter, Wesley College
2021: Charlotte Crossen, WA College of Agriculture, Cunderdin
2022: Ashton Fowler, Harrisdale Senior High School

References

Further reading 
 
 

Australian academic awards
1984 establishments in Australia
Awards established in 1984
Education in Western Australia
Student awards